Glycerol 2-phosphate is the conjugate base of phosphoric ester of glycerol. It is commonly known as β-glycerophosphate or BGP.  Unlike glycerol 1-phosphate and glycerol 3-phosphate, this isomer is not chiral.  It is also less common.

Applications 
β-Glycerophosphate is an inhibitor of the enzyme serine-threonine phosphatase. It is often used in combination with other phosphatase/protease inhibitors for broad spectrum inhibition.

β-Glycerophosphate is also used to drive osteogenic differentiation of bone marrow stem cells in vitro.

β-Glycerophosphate is used to buffer M17 media for Lactococcus culture in recombinant protein expression.

Notes 

Organophosphates